Bloemfontein Celtic Football Club (simply known as Celtic) is a South African amateur football club based in Bloemfontein that competes in the ABC Motsepe League, the third tier of the South African football league system. Bloemfontein Celtic has a large fan base in the Free State. Its supporters were known as Siwelele. The team plays its home matches in Siwelele Park Ground.

The club sold its franchise to Royal AM before the start of the 2021–22 South African Premier Division season.

History
The club was founded by Norman Mathobisa and Victor Mahatane in 1969. They administered the club until the early 1980s when financial challenges forced them to sell the club to Petrus "Whitehead" Molemela. In November 2001, after the relegation of Phunya Sele Sele, Molemela sold his shares in the club to Demetri "Jimmy" Augousti, a former Celtic player.

After only three years out of the top-flight, the club regained its PSL status with an impressive season in 2003–04 when they were crowned First Division champions. They also managed to win the 2005 SAA Supa 8 and the 2007 Telkom Charity Cup.

In 2009 they formed a partnership with Portuguese club Sporting CP, that included the creation of a youth academy, based in the capital of the Free State.

Max Tshabalala, who also owns Roses United, took over from Augousti on 21 July 2014.

Honours
Mainstay Cup: 1985
MTN8/SAA Sup 8 Cup
Winners (1): 2005
Runners-up: 2020
Telkom Charity Cup: 2007
First Division Inland Stream: 2003–04
Telkom Knockout: 2012
 Charity Showdown: 2014
 Nedbank Cup
Runners-up: 2019–2020

Club records

Most starts:  Willem Vries 306
Most goals:  Benjamin Reed 75
Most capped player:  Lehlohonolo Seema
Most starts in a season:  Jeffrey Lekgetla 39 (1992)
Most goals in a season:  Troy Saila 20 (1987)
Record victory: 8–0 vs University of Stellenbosch (26/2/14, Nedbank Cup)
Record defeat: 0–6 vs Kaizer Chiefs (29/3/91, NSL)

Premier Soccer League record
1996–97 – 10th
1997–98 – 12th
1998–99 – 7th
1999–00 – 14th
2000–01 – 17th
2004–05 – 8th
2005–06 – 10th
2006–07 – 8th
2007–08 – 11th
2008–09 – 14th
2009–10 – 6th
2010–11 – 5th
2011–12 – 8th
2012–13 – 5th
2013–14 – 6th
2014–15 – 7th
2015–16 – 11th
2016–17 – 12th
2017–18 – 11th
2018–19 – 8th
2019-20 – 8th
2020–21 – 11th

Club officials/technical team
Chairman:  Max Tshabalala
MD:  Rali Ramabodu
CEO:  Khumbulani Konco
Team manager:  John Maduka
Coach:  Lehlohonolo Seema 
Goalkeeper coach:  Andre Bronkhorst
Head of youth development:  Molefi Ntseki
Sports Scientist:   Molaoa Pakiso

First team squad

Current squad

Out on loan

Kit manufacturer
Kit manufacturer: Umbro

Chairmen
  Norman Mathobisa and Victor Mahatanya (1969–1984)
  Petros Molemela (1984 – November 2001)
  Jimmy Augousti (November 2001 – 21 July 2014)
  Max Tshabalala (21 July 2014 – 22 July 2014)
  Khumo Molahlehi (23 July 2014 – present)

Coaches
 Paul Dolezar (2005–06)
 Tony De Nobrega (2006–07)
 Khabo Zondo (1 July 2007 – 9 April 2008)
 David Modise (interim) (April 2008 – 8 June)
 Mich d'Avray (1 July 2008 – 27 December 2008)
 Owen Da Gama (28 Dec 2008 – 30 June 2010)
 Clinton Larsen (9 Aug 2010 – 7 October 2013)
 Ernst Middendorp (11 Oct 2013 – 15 December 2014)
 Clinton Larsen (15 Dec 2014–2015)
Serame Letsoaka ( 3 Dec 2015–30 Oct 2016)
John Maduka & Lehlohonolo Seema(interim)(30 Oct 2016–3 Jul 2017)
Veselin Jelusic (3 July 2017 – 14 June 2018)
Steve Khompela ( 20 June 2018–27 Dec 2018)
Lehlohonolo Seema (28 Dec 2018– 5 Jul 2020)
John Maduka (6 July 2020–present)

References

External links
 
Premier Soccer League
PSL Club Info
South African Football Association
Confederation of African Football

 
Association football clubs established in 1969
Soccer clubs in South Africa
Soccer clubs in the Free State (province)
Premier Soccer League clubs
Bloemfontein
National First Division clubs
1969 establishments in South Africa